Sava Sekulić (Bilišane, Obrovac, 17 February 1902 – Belgrade, 26 January 1989) was a Serbian Naïve and Outsider art painter.

Biography
He was born in Bilišani in Dalmatinska Zagora near Obrovac, as a Serb in Croatia at the Adriatic Sea coast, in 1902. His mother remarried when his father died when he was 10 years old. Sava Sekulić was raised by his uncle and his aunt. He never attended any schools. His father taught him to read and write. Also, Sava used to quote his father's last words: Learn by yourself, draw and write with a stone in your hand. During World War I, he was harmed and lost one eye when he was 15 years old. He started writing poems when he was 22 and painting in 1932, but he did not dedicate himself to painting exclusively. In 1943, during the World War II he began to work as a builder. Parallel to writing poems, after his retirement in 1962, Sava began to do painting in order to define his poetry more precisely. Sekulić belongs to the group of the so-called outsider artists,  lonely, bizarre, asocial people who create new forms of beauty. His unusual associativity and ability for the materialization of his intellectual energy as a complete self-taught was intuitively and instinctively released. He died in Belgrade, Serbia, in 1989.

Artistic style 
Sekulić is a painter of the universal, the timeless, and the limitless. For him, everything is generalized, from the individual he aspires to the universal, and is very successful. Therefore, his works are the highest achievements of L'art brut, not only in the country but worldwide. Allegories and metaphors are present in nearly all his works. With his visions, he reduced a unique pictorial definition, minimized the subject matter to a metaphor. Most numerous are his compositions with human figures, portraits and scenes with historical and beings. While painting historical personalities, he portrayed the victims as heroes, and the members of his family as mythological beings. However, the most complex is the figure of a woman.

In many works there are philosophical stories and moralizing lessons. Figures are simplified, flat and highly stylised. In the background of every painting is an original story derived from numerous popular legends and beliefs – pagan, Christian, mythological, historical or contemporary.
The myths with the pronounced respect for animals – primordial parents and beliefs on summing up people and animals are presented in his paintings by duplication and compaction of human and animal figure (fish, bird, horse, cow, snake, octopus, deer, bull, he-goat...), multiplication of heads and limbs. The artist prefigured the symbiosis of anthropomorphic and zoomorphic figures, where all the alchemy of his pictorial expression is clearly visible. It is paradoxical that the artist’s very style counteracts the narrative aspect of the painting and concentrates totally on the pictorial value with the strength on an unconscious neo-primitive.

His palette is restricted. He often paints surfaces with different applications of transparent colours, one over the other, without waiting for the earlier layer to dry, which leads to mixing and assimilation of colours. One colour is often predominant in each painting, which sometimes creates a monochrome impression. He sometimes only partly paints the background of certain paintings, thus leaving whole surfaces unpainted. This additionally eliminated any illusion of spatial depth.

Sekulić’s paintings are pervaded with a number of inventive characteristics, the symbiosis of the real and the surreal, with the character of almost pure automatism. The superiority of the artist’s senses overgrows the perception of a beholder. An ordinary observer is not capable of noticing and understanding the sensitive structure of purely pictorial phenomena; his paintings are firstly accepted as a kind of visual intrigue and are later intellectually experienced. Finally, Sava Sekulić is one of the greatest Serbian outsider and naïve painters and a world classic also.

Exhibitions and awards
He participated in independent and group shows in the country (Belgrade, Aranđelovac, Jagodina, Niš, Novi Sad) as well as abroad in significant international exhibitions in: Munich, Paris, Cologne, etc.
He received many prominent international awards. For his works he was awarded posthumously at the Fifth World Triennial of Naïve and Marginal Art IN SITA in Bratislava, 2000, etc.). His most significant works are preserved in the collections of Museum of Naïve and Marginal Art - MNMA, Jagodina, Serbia and in Galerie Charlotte Zander, Bönningheim, Germany.

Recent exhibitions

2019
Belgrade, Gallery RTS, Intuition at the Margins (24 October – 20 November)

2018
Belgrade, Cvijeta Zuzorić Art Pavillion, Magic vitality of the marginal (18 – 30 October)

Belgrade, House of King Peter I, Self-Taught Visionaries of Serbia (27 March - 10 April*)

2017
Paris, Halle Saint Pierre, Turbulences dans les Balkans (7 September 2017 – 31 July)

2016
Belgrade, Heritage House, Sava Sekulić, the Self-taught (20 October - 12 November)

2015
Belgrade, Gallery of Central Military Club, Art in Spiritual Exile (29 May - 15 July)

Prague, Gallery of Luka Praha Museum, THE ART OF OUTSIDERS IN SERBIA (9 April – 30 April)

Gallery

References

Literature 
 Bošković M., Maširević M. (Eds.) (1977, p. 74, 78) Naïfs artist in Serbia. Eskenaziarte: Torino.
 Krstić N. (Ed.) (2003, p. 100) Naïve art in Serbia. SASA: Belgrade - MNMA: Jagodina.
 Krstić N. (Ed.) (2007)  Naïve and Marginal art in Serbia. MNMA: Jagodina.  
 Krstić N. (Ed.) (2013) Outsiders. Catalogue. MNMA, Jagodina.
 Krstić N. (Ed.) (2014, pp. 120–129) Outsider art in Serbia. MNMA: Jagodina.

External links

  Sekulić Sava - Marginal Art in Serbia
 Sekulić Sava - Museum of Naïve and Marginal Art, Jagodina, Serbia

Outsider artists
Naïve painters
Yugoslav painters
20th-century Serbian painters
1902 births
1989 deaths
Serbian male painters
20th-century Serbian male artists